The 1996 Sultan Azlan Shah Cup was the seventh edition of field hockey tournament the Sultan Azlan Shah Cup.

Participating nations
Six countries participated the tournament:

Final ranking
This ranking does not reflect the actual performance of the team as the ranking issued by the International Hockey Federation. This is just a benchmark ranking in the Sultan Azlan Shah Cup only.

References

External links
Official website

1996 in field hockey
1996
1996 in Malaysian sport
1996 in Australian sport
1996 in British sport
1996 in Indian sport
1996 in Dutch sport
1996 in South Korean sport